To the Power of Eight is the eighth studio album by German a cappella metal band Van Canto, released on June 4, 2021 via Napalm. It features the band's former lead singer Dennis "Sly" Schunke as guest vocalist on all tracks.

Background, recording and themes 
After guest singing with them live at the 2019 Summer Breeze Open Air, former lead vocalist Sly was invited as featured singer on one or two of the album's tracks, but he ended up singing all of them after the group was pleased with how the three lead vocalists sounded together.

Drums were recorded in the beginning of September 2020 at Kohlekeller-Studio. Vocals were mostly recorded at Stefan Schmidt's own studio, with Ross Thompson and Jan Moritz recording their parts remotely.

Album cover and title 
The name of the album is a reference to it being the band's eight album and featuring eight musicians in total. The cover depicts lead vocalist Inga Scharf pulling a tanker into a port; the band initially wanted to follow up the cover of their previous album Trust in Rust, so they thought of rust on verdigris in an industrial scenario. The idea of pulling something powerful came as a reference to the word "power" from the title.

Song information 
Of the 12 tracks of the album, eight are new and four are covers.

The title and opening track was released with the album's teaser. "Turn Back Time", the album's ballad, was written in 1999 by Schmidt and drummer Bastian Emig, but they decided to release it only decades later because the lyrics deal with the past.

"Hardrock Padlock" was written as a tribute to the 1980s, especially songs written by Desmond Child for Bon Jovi, Aerosmith and Alice Cooper.

Release and promotion 
To the Power of Eight was released as LP Gatefold, CD Digipack and on digital format.

"Falling Down" was released on 19 April 2021. Amon Amarth cover "Raise Your Horns" was released on 10 May 2021. On 1 June 2021, they released the single "Faith Focus Finish". On 9 June 2021, they released the single "Dead By the Night".

Critical reception 

Writing for the German edition of Metal Hammer, Sarah Angeli praised the album as a whole, criticizing only their cover of Iron Maiden's "Run to the Hills" for not coming "close to the original". She finished her review by saying van Canto "has again succeeded in creating an atmospheric, innovative work of art for the loop."

Track listing

Personnel
Band members
Ingo Sterzinger – bass vocals, backing vocals
Ross Thompson – higher rakkatakka vocals
Inga Scharf – lead vocals
Stefan Schmidt – lower rakkatakka vocals, wah-wah vocals
Bastian Emig – drums, backing vocals
Jan Moritz – bass vocals, pad, backing vocals
Hagen Hirschmann – lead vocals

Guest musician
Philip Dennis Schunke – lead vocals

Charts

References

2021 albums
Napalm Records albums
Van Canto albums